Stefan Weidner (born 1967 in Cologne) is a German Islamic studies scholar, writer and translator. Due to his contributions to the reception of Arabic and other Middle Eastern literatures, the Islamic scholar  described him as a "leading mediator of Middle Eastern poetry and prose into German".

Life 
Already as a schoolboy, Weidner travelled to North Africa and made his first experiences with Islam. He later studied Islamic studies, German and philosophy at the universities of Georg-August-Universität Göttingen, University of Damascus, University of California, Berkeley and Rheinische Friedrich-Wilhelms-Universität Bonn. Weidner works as an author, translator, literary critic. From 2001 until the last issue in 2016, he was editor-in-chief of the journal Fikrun wa Fann which was published by the Goethe-Institut and aimed to contribute to the dialogue between Western and Islamic-influenced cultures. He has translated numerous poems from Arabic, including Adonis and Mahmud Darwish.

Weidner is a member of the Deutsche Akademie für Sprache und Dichtung and the writers' association PEN Centre Germany. He writes for the Süddeutsche Zeitung the Frankfurter Allgemeine Zeitung Die Zeit and Qantara.de.

His 400-page non-fiction book 1001 Buch: Die Literaturen des Orients has been described as an expert "walk through the centuries of the literatures of the Orient". Islamic scholar Stefan Wild commented on the book as follows: "Now, with 1001 Buch, he [Weidner] has succeeded in his greatest throw yet: an overall view of Arabic, Persian and Ottoman/Turkish literature from the seventh century to the present day."

Publications 
 Author
 Erlesener Orient. Ein Führer durch die Literaturen der islamischen Welt. Edition Elene, Vienna 2004,  (Literary criticism).
 Mohammedanische Versuchungen. Ein erzählter Essay. Ammann Verlag, Zürich 2004, 237 pages
 „…und sehnen uns nach einem neuen Gott…“ Poesie und Religion im Werk von Adonis. Verlag Schiler, Berlin 2005, .
 Allah heißt Gott. Eine Reise durch den Islam. Fischer Taschenbuch, Frankfurt 2006  (Non-fiction book for the youth)
 Fes. Sieben Umkreisungen. Amann Verlag, Zürich 2006 .
 Manual für den Kampf der Kulturen. Warum der Islam eine Herausforderung ist. Ein Versuch. Verlag der Weltreligionen, Frankfurt 2008 
 Mohammedanische Versuchungen. Ein erzählter Essay. Neuausg. Suhrkamp, Frankfurt 2008, 
 Aufbruch in die Vernunft. Islamdebatten und islamische Welt zwischen 9/11 und den arabischen Revolutionen. Verlag J.H.W. Dietz Nachf., Bonn 2011 
 Das Morgenland des Gefühls braucht eine Neue Sachlichkeit. Essay, FAZ, 14 January 2013, 
 Anti-Pegida: Eine Streitschrift. Create Space Independent Publishing, 2015 
 Fluchthelferin Poesie. Friedrich Rückert und der Orient. Wallstein, Göttingen 2017, 
 Jenseits des Westens: Für ein neues kosmopolitisches Denken. Carl Hanser Verlag, Munich 2018, .
 1001 Buch: Die Literaturen des Orients, Verlag Edition Converso, Bad Herrenalb 2019, .
Ground Zero: 9/11 und die Geburt der Gegenwart, Carl Hanser Verlag, Munich 2021, .

 Publisher
 Die Farbe der Ferne. Moderne arabische Lyrik. C.H. Beck Verlag, Munich 2000, 296 pages
 Kaffeeduft und Brandgeruch. Beirut erzählt. Ein Lesebuch. Suhrkamp Verlag, Frankfurt, 2002, 314 pages
 Adonis: Wortgesang. Von der Dichtung zur Revolution. S. Fischer, Frankfurt, 2012 

 Translator
 Ibn Arabi: Der Übersetzer der Sehnsüchte. Liebesgedichte aus dem arabischen Mittelalter. Jung und Jung, Salzburg 2016

Awards 
 2006: Clemens-Brentano-Preis der Stadt Heidelberg
 2007: Johann-Heinrich-Voß-Preis für Übersetzung
 2008: 
 2011: Thomas-Kling-Poetikdozentur der Universität Bonn
 2014: Paul Scheerbart-Preis für die Adonis-Übersetzung
 2017: Member of the Deutsche Akademie für Sprache und Dichtung
 2018: First prize of the Sheikh Hamad Award for Translation and International Understanding for his translations of Ibn Arabi's "Übersetzer der Sehnsüchte"

See also 
 Quran translations, with Weidner's version of Surah 97

References

External links 
 
 Stefan Weidner on Literaturport
 
 Zur Verleihung des Scheerbart-Preises, Laudatio von Hans-Jürgen Balmes, im Bericht von  Verleihung der  at St. W.,  and Bettina Abarbanell, Frankfurt, 10 October 2014; zu Weidner die Kapitel: Wie von einem Kristall umschlossen und E-Book als Architektur aus Glas. In , 1, 2015, S. 5f.
 Deutschlandfunk Essay und Diskurs vom 20. Januar 2019: Liberalismus. Unsere Freiheit, von außen gesehen
 Deutschlandfunk Essay und Diskurs from 7 July 2019: Neuer Antisemitismus – Befund, Analyse, Verstehen (4/6): Arabischer Antisemitismus im globalen Spannungsfeld

German Islamic studies scholars
Translators from Arabic
Arabic–German translators
German literary critics
20th-century German journalists
1967 births
Living people
Writers from Cologne